Welcome to the Club is an American animated short film based on the television series The Simpsons produced by Gracie Films and 20th Television Animation, debuting on the streaming service Disney+ on September 8, 2022, and received mixed reviews from critics. Like the previous shorts, it was directed by David Silverman.

Plot
Lisa and Bart approach a castle, and Lisa is excited to become an officially recognized Disney Princess. However, Bart turns out to have been a disguise by Loki to trick Lisa into instead joining forces with the Disney Villains. A musical number is performed by many classic Disney villains, such as Ursula, Cruella de Vil, Captain Hook, Queen of Hearts, Maleficent, Evil Queen (in her witch form), Jafar, Hades, Scar and Kaa alongside several Disney prince characters, to try and convince Lisa to become a Disney villain. Lisa then points out that many Disney villains end up dying, to which the villains point out that it's better than living “happily ever after” with a generic Disney prince. Mickey Mouse interrupts the number, and the short ends with many of the Disney princes forming together the shape of Mickey's head on the floor.

Release
Welcome to the Club was released on Disney+ Day on September 8, 2022. On September 1, the first promotional poster had been revealed. Another poster was released on the Disney+ Day. Both posters are portraying Lisa Simpson and Ursula from The Little Mermaid.

Cast
 Nancy Cartwright as Bart Simpson and Mickey Mouse
 Cartwright also voiced Loki, while he was disguised as Bart
 Yeardley Smith as Lisa Simpson and Snow White
 Chris Edgerly as Prince Charming and Disney princes
 Dawnn Lewis as Kaa and Ursula
 Tress MacNeille as Cruella de Vil, Evil Queen and Queen of Hearts
 Kevin Michael Richardson as Captain Hook and Disney princes
 Tom Hiddleston as Loki

Reception
John Schwarz of Bubbleblabber gave Welcome to the Club a five out of ten stating "The late Pat Carroll is spinning in her grave for this one. Yes, we get another Tom Hiddleston cameo, but really this short is quite skippable. The song, while containing some funny lyrics, abruptly ends and really features no resolve to the initial bit the producers were trying to pull off with Lisa. As cool as it was to see The Simpsons again after several months off, the shorts are starting to irk me a bit in their execution".

References

External links
 
 

Disney+ original films
Promotional films
The Simpsons short films
2022 short films
2022 animated films
2020s animated short films
Films directed by David Silverman
Films produced by James L. Brooks
Films produced by Matt Groening
2020s English-language films
Gracie Films films
American animated short films
20th Century Studios short films
2020s American films